The 22nd Biathlon World Championships for men were held in 1986 in Oslo, Norway. The 3rd women's world championships were held in Falun, Sweden.

Men's results

20 km individual

10 km sprint

Peter Angerer, West Germany, was stripped of silver due to use of a forbidden substance.

4 × 7.5 km relay

The West German team was stripped of bronze due to Peter Angerer's use of a forbidden substance.

Women's results

10 km individual

5 km sprint

3 × 5 km relay

Medal table

References

1986
Biathlon World Championships
International sports competitions hosted by Sweden
1986 in Norwegian sport
1986 in Swedish sport
International sports competitions in Oslo
Biathlon competitions in Sweden
Biathlon competitions in Norway
1980s in Oslo
Sports competitions in Falun
Holmenkollen
February 1986 sports events in Europe